A list of films produced in the Tamil film industry in India in 1942:

1942

References

Films, Tamil
Lists of 1942 films by country or language
1942
1940s Tamil-language films